Ron Grant may refer to:
Ronald Grant, president & chief operating officer of AOL LLC
Ron Grant (motorcyclist) (1941–1994), Grand Prix motorcycle road racer and tuner
Ron Grant (runner) (born 1943), Australian long distance runner